Euriphene camarensis is a butterfly in the family Nymphalidae. It is found in Cameroon, Gabon and the Democratic Republic of the Congo (Mongala, Uele, Ituri, Equateur, Sankuru, Lomami).

References

Butterflies described in 1871
Euriphene
Insects of Cameroon
Fauna of Gabon
Fauna of the Democratic Republic of the Congo
Butterflies of Africa
Taxa named by Christopher Ward (entomologist)